"Les play boys" is the second single by French singer-songwriter Jacques Dutronc, released in 1966. It features on his self-titled debut album.

Composition 
"Les play boys" was recorded in October 1966, shortly after a performance at the Golf-Drouot nightclub in Paris.

According to co-writer Jacques Lanzmann, the song's innuendo-laden lyrics reflected his experience as the editor of the men's magazine Lui: "At that time, even a hint of hair sticking out from a bikini would have seen the magazine shut down".

Release and promotion 
"Les play boys" was released as a four-track EP in France in November 1966.

Dutronc performed "Les play boys" on the French television show Palmarès des chansons, broadcast by Office de Radiodiffusion Télévision Française on 16 November 1966, accompanied by the Orchestre Raymond Lefèvre. He also toured to promote the single.

In 1971, he sing the song in duet with Annie Cordy during a show who honored the actress / singer on France 2 named "Annie sur la 2".

Reception
"Les play boys" reached number 1 in the French singles chart on 3 December 1966, where it stayed for six weeks. It sold 600,000 copies.

Cover versions
"Les play boys" has been covered by Serge Gainsbourg and The Divine Comedy.

Track listing 
Words by Jacques Lanzmann and music by Jacques Dutronc.

Side A

Side B

Personnel 
Jacques Dutronc: voice, guitar, percussion
Hadi Kalafate: bass, percussion
Alain Le Govic (alias Alain Chamfort): piano, organ
Jean-Pierre Alarcen: guitar
Jacques Pasut: rhythm guitar
Michel Pelay: drums

References

External links
Video of Jacques Dutronc performing "Les play boys" on the French TV show Palmarès des chansons, November 1966.

Jacques Dutronc songs
1966 singles
Songs written by Jacques Lanzmann
Songs written by Jacques Dutronc
1966 songs
Disques Vogue singles